

Events

Pre-1600
 472 – After being besieged in Rome by his own generals, Western Roman Emperor Anthemius is captured in St. Peter's Basilica and put to death.
 813 – Byzantine emperor Michael I, under threat by conspiracies, abdicates in favor of his general Leo the Armenian, and becomes a monk (under the name Athanasius).
911 – Signing of the Treaty of Saint-Clair-sur-Epte between Charles the Simple and Rollo of Normandy.
1174 – Baldwin IV, 13, becomes King of Jerusalem, with Raymond III, Count of Tripoli as regent and William of Tyre as chancellor.
1302 – Battle of the Golden Spurs (Guldensporenslag in Dutch): A coalition around the Flemish cities defeats the king of France's royal army.
1346 – Charles IV, Count of Luxembourg and King of Bohemia, is elected King of the Romans.
1405 – Ming admiral Zheng He sets sail to explore the world for the first time.
1410 – Ottoman Interregnum: Süleyman Çelebi defeats his brother Musa Çelebi outside the Ottoman capital, Edirne.
1476 – Giuliano della Rovere is appointed bishop of Coutances.
1576 – While exploring the North Atlantic Ocean in an attempt to find the Northwest Passage, Martin Frobisher sights Greenland, mistaking it for the hypothesized (but non-existent) island of "Frisland".

1601–1900
1616 – Samuel de Champlain returns to Quebec.
1735 – Mathematical calculations suggest that it is on this day that dwarf planet Pluto moved inside the orbit of Neptune for the last time before 1979.
1789 – Jacques Necker is dismissed as France's Finance Minister sparking the Storming of the Bastille.
1796 – The United States takes possession of Detroit from Great Britain under terms of the Jay Treaty.
1798 – The United States Marine Corps is re-established; they had been disbanded after the American Revolutionary War.
1801 – French astronomer Jean-Louis Pons makes his first comet discovery. In the next 27 years he discovers another 36 comets, more than any other person in history.
1804 – A duel occurs in which the Vice President of the United States Aaron Burr mortally wounds former Secretary of the Treasury Alexander Hamilton.
1833 – Noongar Australian aboriginal warrior Yagan, wanted for the murder of white colonists in Western Australia, is killed.
1836 – The Fly-fisher's Entomology is published by Alfred Ronalds. The book transformed the sport and went to many editions.
1848 – Waterloo railway station in London opens.
1864 – American Civil War: Battle of Fort Stevens; Confederate forces attempt to invade Washington, D.C.
1882 – The British Mediterranean Fleet begins the Bombardment of Alexandria in Egypt as part of the Anglo-Egyptian War.
1889 – Tijuana, Mexico, is founded.
1893 – The first cultured pearl is obtained by Kōkichi Mikimoto.
  1893   – A revolution led by the liberal general and politician José Santos Zelaya takes over state power in Nicaragua.
1897 – Salomon August Andrée leaves Spitsbergen to attempt to reach the North Pole by balloon.
1899 – Fiat founded by Giovanni Agnelli in Turin, Italy.

1901–present
1906 – Murder of Grace Brown by Chester Gillette in the United States, inspiration for Theodore Dreiser's An American Tragedy.
1914 – Babe Ruth makes his debut in Major League Baseball.
  1914   –  is launched.
1919 – The eight-hour day and free Sunday become law for workers in the Netherlands.
1920 – In the East Prussian plebiscite the local populace decides to remain with Weimar Germany.
1921 – A truce in the Irish War of Independence comes into effect.
  1921   – The Red Army captures Mongolia from the White Army and establishes the Mongolian People's Republic.
  1921   – Former president of the United States William Howard Taft is sworn in as 10th chief justice of the U.S. Supreme Court, becoming the only person ever to hold both offices.
1922 – The Hollywood Bowl opens.
1924 – Eric Liddell won the gold medal in 400m at the 1924 Paris Olympics, after refusing to run in the heats for 100m, his favoured distance, on a Sunday.
1934 – Engelbert Zaschka of Germany flies his large human-powered aircraft, the Zaschka Human-Power Aircraft, about 20 meters at Berlin Tempelhof Airport without assisted take-off.
1936 – The Triborough Bridge in New York City is opened to traffic.
1940 – World War II: Vichy France regime is formally established. Philippe Pétain becomes Chief of the French State.
1941 – The Northern Rhodesian Labour Party holds its first congress in Nkana.
1943 – Massacres of Poles in Volhynia and Eastern Galicia by the Ukrainian Insurgent Army within the Reichskommissariat Ukraine (Volhynia) peak.
  1943   – World War II: Allied invasion of Sicily: German and Italian troops launch a counter-attack on Allied forces in Sicily.
1947 – The Exodus 1947 heads to Palestine from France.
1950 – Pakistan joins the International Monetary Fund and the International Bank.
1957 – Prince Karim Husseini Aga Khan IV inherits the office of Imamat as the 49th Imam of Shia Imami Ismai'li worldwide, after the death of Sir Sultan Mahommed Shah Aga Khan III.
1960 – France legislates for the independence of Dahomey (later Benin), Upper Volta (later Burkina Faso) and Niger.
  1960   – Congo Crisis: The State of Katanga breaks away from the Democratic Republic of the Congo.
  1960   – To Kill a Mockingbird by Harper Lee is first published, in the United States.
1962 – First transatlantic satellite television transmission.
  1962   – Project Apollo: At a press conference, NASA announces lunar orbit rendezvous as the means to land astronauts on the Moon, and return them to Earth.
1971 – Copper mines in Chile are nationalized.
1972 – The first game of the World Chess Championship 1972 between challenger Bobby Fischer and defending champion Boris Spassky starts.
1973 – Varig Flight 820 crashes near Paris on approach to Orly Airport, killing 123 of the 134 on board. In response, the FAA bans smoking in airplane lavatories.
1977 – Martin Luther King Jr., assassinated in 1968, is awarded the Presidential Medal of Freedom.
1978 – Los Alfaques disaster: A truck carrying liquid gas crashes and explodes at a coastal campsite in Tarragona, Spain killing 216 tourists.
1979 – America's first space station, Skylab, is destroyed as it re-enters the Earth's atmosphere over the Indian Ocean.
1982 – The Italy National Football Team defeats West Germany at Santiago Bernabéu Stadium to capture the 1982 FIFA World Cup.
1983 – A TAME airline Boeing 737–200 crashes near Cuenca, Ecuador, killing all 119 passengers and crew on board.
1990 – Oka Crisis: First Nations land dispute in Quebec begins.
1991 – Nigeria Airways Flight 2120 crashes in Jeddah, Saudi Arabia, killing all 261 passengers and crew on board.
1995 – Yugoslav Wars: Srebrenica massacre begins; lasts until 22 July.
2006 – Mumbai train bombings: Two hundred nine people are killed in a series of bomb attacks in Mumbai, India.
2010 – The Islamist militia group Al-Shabaab carried out multiple suicide bombings in Kampala, Uganda, killing 74 people and injuring 85 others.
  2010   – Spain defeat the Netherlands to win the 2010 FIFA World Cup in Johannesburg.
2011 – Ninety-eight containers of explosives self-detonate killing 13 people in Zygi, Cyprus.
2015 – Joaquín "El Chapo" Guzmán escapes from the maximum security Altiplano prison in Mexico, his second escape.
2021 – Richard Branson becomes the first civilian to be launched into space via his Virgin Galactic spacecraft.
2021 – Italy defeats England in the UEFA Euro 2020 Final to win their second European title.

Births

Pre-1600
 154 – Bardaisan, Syrian astrologer, scholar, and philosopher (d. 222)
1274 – Robert the Bruce, Scottish king (d. 1329)
1406 – William, Margrave of Hachberg-Sausenberg (d. 1482)
1459 – Kaspar, Count Palatine of Zweibrücken, German nobleman (d. 1527)
1558 – Robert Greene, English author and playwright (d. 1592)
1561 – Luis de Góngora, Spanish cleric and poet (d. 1627)

1601–1900
1603 – Kenelm Digby, English astrologer, courtier, and diplomat (d. 1665)
1628 – Tokugawa Mitsukuni, Japanese daimyō (d. 1701)
1653 – Sarah Good, American woman accused of witchcraft (d. 1692)
1657 – Frederick I of Prussia (d. 1713)
1662 – Maximilian II Emanuel, Elector of Bavaria (d. 1726)
1709 – Johan Gottschalk Wallerius, Swedish chemist and mineralogist (d. 1785)
1723 – Jean-François Marmontel, French historian and author (d. 1799)
1754 – Thomas Bowdler, English physician and philanthropist (d. 1825)
1760 – Peggy Shippen, American wife of Benedict Arnold and American Revolutionary War spy (d. 1804)
1767 – John Quincy Adams, American lawyer and politician, 6th President of the United States (d. 1848)
1826 – Alexander Afanasyev, Russian ethnographer and author (d. 1871)
1832 – Charilaos Trikoupis, Greek lawyer and politician, 55th Prime Minister of Greece (d. 1896)
1834 – James Abbott McNeill Whistler, American-English painter and illustrator (d. 1903)
1836 – Antônio Carlos Gomes, Brazilian composer (d. 1896)
1846 – Léon Bloy, French author and poet (d. 1917) 
1849 – N. E. Brown, English plant taxonomist and authority on succulents (d. 1934)
1850 – Annie Armstrong, American missionary (d. 1938)
1866 – Princess Irene of Hesse and by Rhine (d. 1953)
1875 – H. M. Brock, British painter and illustrator (d. 1960)
1880 – Friedrich Lahrs, German architect and academic (d. 1964)
1881 – Isabel Martin Lewis, American astronomer and author (d. 1966)
1882 – James Larkin White, American miner, explorer, and park ranger (d. 1946)
1886 – Boris Grigoriev, Russian painter and illustrator (d. 1939)
1888 – Carl Schmitt, German philosopher and jurist (d. 1985)
1892 – Thomas Mitchell, American actor, singer, and screenwriter (d. 1962)
1894 – Erna Mohr, German zoologist (d. 1968)
1895 – Dorothy Wilde, English author and poet (d. 1941)
1897 – Bull Connor, American police officer (d. 1973)
1899 – Wilfrid Israel, German businessman and philanthropist (d. 1943)
  1899   – E. B. White, American essayist and journalist (d. 1985)

1901–present
1901 – Gwendolyn Lizarraga, Belizean businesswoman, activist, and politician (d. 1975)
1903 – Rudolf Abel, English-Russian colonel (d. 1971)
  1903   – Sidney Franklin, American bullfighter (d. 1976)
1904 – Niño Ricardo, Spanish guitarist and composer (d. 1972)
1905 – Betty Allan, Australian statistician and biometrician (d. 1952)
1906 – Harry von Zell, American actor and announcer (d. 1981)
  1906   – Herbert Wehner, German politician, Minister of Intra-German Relations (d. 1990)
1909 – Irene Hervey, American actress (d. 1998)
  1909   – Jacques Clemens, Dutch catholic priest (d. 2018)
1910 – Sally Blane, American actress (d. 1997)
1911 – Erna Flegel, German nurse who was still present in the Führerbunker when it was captured by Soviet troops (d. 2006)
1912 – Sergiu Celibidache, Romanian conductor and composer (d. 1996)
  1912   – Peta Taylor, English cricketer (d. 1989)
  1912   – William F. Walsh, American captain and politician, 48th Mayor of Syracuse (d. 2011)
1913 – Paul Gibb, English cricketer (d. 1977)
  1913   – Cordwainer Smith, American sinologist, author, and academic (d. 1966)
1916 – Mortimer Caplin, American tax attorney, educator, and IRS Commissioner (d. 2019)
  1916   – Hans Maier, Dutch water polo player (d. 2018)
  1916   – Alexander Prokhorov, Australian-Russian physicist and academic, Nobel Prize laureate (d. 2002)
  1916   – Reg Varney, English actor and screenwriter (d. 2008)
  1916   – Gough Whitlam, Australian lieutenant, lawyer, and politician, 21st Prime Minister of Australia (d. 2014)
1918 – Venetia Burney, English educator, who named Pluto (d. 2009)
1920 – Yul Brynner, Russian actor and dancer (d. 1985)
  1920   – Zecharia Sitchin, Russian-American author (d. 2010)
1922 – Gene Evans, American actor (d. 1998)
  1922   – Fritz Riess, German-Swiss racing driver (d. 1991)
1923 – Richard Pipes, Polish-American historian and academic (d. 2018)
  1923   – Tun Tun, Indian actress and comedian (d. 2003)
1924 – César Lattes, Brazilian physicist and academic (d. 2005)
  1924   – Brett Somers, Canadian-American actress and singer (d. 2007)
  1924   – Charlie Tully, Northern Irish footballer and manager (d. 1971)
  1924   – Oscar Wyatt, American businessman
1925 – Charles Chaynes, French composer (d. 2016)
  1925   – Nicolai Gedda, Swedish operatic tenor (d. 2017)
  1925   – Peter Kyros, American lawyer and politician (d. 2012)
  1925   – Sid Smith, Canadian ice hockey player and coach (d. 2004)
1926 – Frederick Buechner, American minister, theologian, and author (d. 2022)
1927 – Theodore Maiman, American-Canadian physicist and engineer (d. 2007)
  1927   – Chris Leonard, English footballer (d. 1987)
1928 – Greville Janner, Baron Janner of Braunstone, Welsh-English lawyer and politician (d. 2015)
  1928   – Bobo Olson, American boxer (d. 2002)
  1928   – Andrea Veneracion, Filipina choirmaster (d. 2014)
1929 – Danny Flores, American singer-songwriter and saxophonist (d. 2006)
  1929   – David Kelly, Irish actor (d. 2012)
1930 – Jack Alabaster, New Zealand cricketer 
  1930   – Harold Bloom, American literary critic (d. 2019) 
  1930   – Trevor Storer, English businessman, founded Pukka Pies (d. 2013)
  1930   – Ezra Vogel, American sociologist (d. 2020)
1931 – Dick Gray, American baseball player (d. 2013)
  1931   – Thurston Harris, American doo-wop singer (d. 1990)
  1931   – Tab Hunter, American actor and singer (d. 2018)
  1931   – Tullio Regge, Italian physicist and academic (d. 2014)
1932 – Alex Hassilev, French-born American folk singer and musician
  1932   – Jean-Guy Talbot, Canadian ice hockey player and coach
1933 – Jim Carlen, American football player and coach (d. 2012)
  1933   – Frank Kelso, American admiral and politician, United States Secretary of the Navy (d. 2013)
1934 – Giorgio Armani, Italian fashion designer, founded the Armani Company
1935 – Frederick Hemke, American saxophonist and educator (d. 2019)
  1935   – Oliver Napier, Northern Irish lawyer and politician (d. 2011)
1937 – Pai Hsien-yung, Chinese-Taiwanese author
1941 – Bill Boggs, American journalist and producer
  1941   – Henry Lowther, English trumpet player
1943 – Richard Carleton, Australian journalist  (d. 2006)
  1943   – Howard Gardner, American psychologist and academic
  1943   – Tom Holland, American actor, director, and screenwriter
  1943   – Peter Jensen, Australian metropolitan
  1943   – Robert Malval, Haitian businessman and politician, 5th Prime Minister of Haiti
  1943   – Rolf Stommelen, German racing driver (d. 1983)
1944 – Lou Hudson, American basketball player and coach (d. 2014)
  1944   – Michael Levy, Baron Levy, English philanthropist
  1944   – Patricia Polacco, American author and illustrator
1946 – Martin Wong, American painter (d. 1999)
1947 – Jeff Hanna, American singer-songwriter, guitarist, and drummer 
  1947   – Norman Lebrecht, English author and critic
  1947   – Bo Lundgren, Swedish politician
1950 – Pervez Hoodbhoy, Pakistani physicist and academic
  1950   – J. R. Morgan, Welsh author and academic
  1950   – Bonnie Pointer, American singer (d. 2020)
1951 – Ed Ott, American baseball player and coach
1952 – Bill Barber, Canadian ice hockey player and coach
  1952   – Stephen Lang, American actor and playwright
1953 – Piyasvasti Amranand, Thai businessman and politician, Thai Minister of Energy
  1953   – Angélica Aragón, Mexican film, television, and stage actress and singer
  1953   – Peter Brown, American singer-songwriter and producer
  1953   – Suresh Prabhu, Indian accountant and politician, Indian Minister of Railways
  1953   – Patricia Reyes Spíndola, Mexican actress, director, and producer
  1953   – Leon Spinks, American boxer (d. 2021)
  1953   – Mindy Sterling, American actress
  1953   – Ivan Toms, South African physician and activist (d. 2008)
  1953   – Bramwell Tovey, English-Canadian conductor and composer
  1953   – Paul Weiland, English director, producer, and screenwriter
1954 – Julia King, English engineer and academic
1955 – Balaji Sadasivan, Singaporean neurosurgeon and politician, Singaporean Minister of Health (d. 2010)
1956 – Amitav Ghosh, Indian-American author and academic
  1956   – Robin Renucci, French actor and director
  1956   – Sela Ward, American actress
1957 – Johann Lamont, Scottish educator and politician
  1957   – Peter Murphy, English singer-songwriter
  1957   – Patsy O'Hara,  Irish Republican hunger striker (d. 1981)
  1957   – Michael Rose, Jamaican singer-songwriter 
1958 – Stephanie Dabney, American ballerina (d. 2022)
  1958   – Mark Lester, English actor
  1958   – Hugo Sánchez, Mexican footballer, coach, and manager
1959 – Richie Sambora, American singer-songwriter, guitarist, and producer 
  1959   – Suzanne Vega, American singer-songwriter, guitarist, and producer
1960 – David Baerwald, American singer-songwriter, composer, and musician
  1960   – Caroline Quentin, English actress
1961 – Antony Jenkins, English banker and businessman
1962 – Gaétan Duchesne, Canadian ice hockey player (d. 2007)
  1962   – Pauline McLynn, Irish actress and author
  1962   – Fumiya Fujii, Japanese music artist
1963 – Al MacInnis, Canadian ice hockey player and coach
  1963   – Dean Richards, English rugby player and coach
  1963   – Lisa Rinna, American actress and talk show host
  1964   – Craig Charles, English actor and TV presenter 
1965 – Tony Cottee, English footballer, manager, and sportscaster
  1965   – Ernesto Hoost, Dutch kick-boxer and sportscaster
  1965   – Scott Shriner, American singer-songwriter and bass player 
1966 – Nadeem Aslam, Pakistani-English author
  1966   – Kentaro Miura, Japanese author and illustrator (d. 2021)
  1966   – Rod Strickland, American basketball player and coach
  1966   – Ricky Warwick, Northern Irish musician 
1967 – Andy Ashby, American baseball player and sportscaster
  1967   – Jhumpa Lahiri, Indian American novelist and short story writer
1968 – Michael Geist, Canadian journalist and academic
  1968   – Daniel MacMaster, Canadian singer-songwriter (d. 2008)
  1968   – Esera Tuaolo, American football player
1969 – Ned Boulting, British sports journalist and television presenter
1970 – Justin Chambers, American actor
  1970   – Sajjad Karim, English lawyer and politician
  1970   – Eric Owens, American opera singer 
1971 – Leisha Hailey, Japanese-American singer-songwriter and actress 
1972 – Cormac Battle, English-Irish singer-songwriter, guitarist, and producer  
1973 – Konstantinos Kenteris, Greek runner
1974 – Alanas Chošnau, Lithuanian singer-songwriter
  1974   – Hermann Hreiðarsson, Icelandic footballer and manager
  1974   – André Ooijer, Dutch footballer and coach
1975 – Willie Anderson, American football player
  1975   – Rubén Baraja, Spanish footballer and manager
  1975   – Lil' Kim, American rapper and producer
1976 – Eduardo Nájera, Mexican-American basketball player and coach
1977 – Brandon Short, American football player and sportscaster
1978 – Kathleen Edwards, Canadian singer-songwriter and guitarist
  1978   – Massimiliano Rosolino, Italian swimmer
1979 – Raio Piiroja, Estonian footballer
1980 – Tyson Kidd, Canadian wrestler
  1980   – Kevin Powers, American soldier and author
1981 – Andre Johnson, American football player
  1981   – Susana Barreiros, Venezuelan judge
1982 – Chris Cooley, American football player
1983 – Engin Baytar, German-Turkish footballer
  1983   – Peter Cincotti, American singer-songwriter and pianist
  1983   – Marie Serneholt, Swedish singer and dancer 
1984 – Yorman Bazardo, Venezuelan baseball player
  1984   – Tanith Belbin, Canadian-American ice dancer
  1984   – Jacoby Jones, American football player
  1984   – Joe Pavelski, American ice hockey player
  1984   – Morné Steyn, South African rugby player
1985 – Robert Adamson, American actor, director, and producer
  1985   – Orestis Karnezis, Greek footballer
1986 – Raúl García, Spanish footballer
  1986   – Yoann Gourcuff, French footballer
  1986   – Ryan Jarvis, English footballer
1987 – Shigeaki Kato, Japanese singer 
1988 – Étienne Capoue, French footballer
  1988   – Natalie La Rose, Dutch singer, songwriter and dancer
1989 – Tobias Sana, Swedish footballer
  1989   – Travis Waddell, Australian rugby league player
  1989   – Shimanoumi Koyo, Japanese sumo wrestler
1990 – Mona Barthel, German tennis player
  1990   – Connor Paolo, American actor
  1990   – Adam Jezierski, Polish-Spanish actor and singer
  1990   – Patrick Peterson, American football player
  1990   – Caroline Wozniacki, Danish tennis player
1993 – Rebecca Bross, American gymnast
  1993   – Heini Salonen, Finnish tennis player
1994 – Bartłomiej Kalinkowski, Polish footballer
  1994   – Anthony Milford, Australian rugby league player 
  1994   – Nina Nesbitt, Scottish singer-songwriter and guitarist
  1994   – Lucas Ocampos, Argentinian footballer
1995 – Joey Bosa, American football player
  1995   – Tyler Medeiros, Canadian singer-songwriter and dancer
1996 – Alessia Cara, Canadian singer-songwriter
2002 – Amad Diallo, Ivorian footballer

Deaths

Pre-1600
 472 – Anthemius, Roman emperor (b. 420)
 937 – Rudolph II of Burgundy (b. 880)
 969 – Olga of Kiev (b. 890)
1174 – Amalric I of Jerusalem (b. 1136)
1183 – Otto I Wittelsbach, Duke of Bavaria (b. 1117)
1302 – Robert II, Count of Artois (b. 1250)
  1302   – Pierre Flotte, French politician and lawyer 
1344 – Ulrich III, Count of Württemberg (b. c. 1286)
1362 – Anna von Schweidnitz, empress of Charles IV (b. 1339)
1382 – Nicole Oresme, French philosopher (b. 1325)
1451 – Barbara of Cilli, Slovenian noblewoman
1484 – Mino da Fiesole, Italian sculptor (b. c. 1429)
1535 – Joachim I Nestor, Elector of Brandenburg (b. 1484)
1581 – Peder Skram, Danish admiral and politician (b. 1503)
1593 – Giuseppe Arcimboldo, Italian painter (b. 1527)
1599 – Chōsokabe Motochika, Japanese daimyō (b.1539)

1601–1900
1688 – Narai, Thai king (b. 1629)
1774 – Sir William Johnson, 1st Baronet, Irish-English general (b. 1715)
1775 – Simon Boerum, American farmer and politician (b. 1724)
1797 – Ienăchiță Văcărescu, Romanian historian and philologist (b. 1740)
1806 – James Smith, Irish-American lawyer and politician (b. 1719)
1825 – Thomas P. Grosvenor, American soldier and politician (b. 1744)
1844 – Yevgeny Baratynsky, Russian philosopher and poet (b. 1800)
1897 – Patrick Jennings, Irish-Australian politician, 11th Premier of New South Wales (b. 1831)

1901–present
1905 – Muhammad Abduh, Egyptian jurist and scholar (b. 1849)
1908 – Friedrich Traun, German sprinter and tennis player (b. 1876)
1909 – Simon Newcomb, Canadian-American astronomer and mathematician (b. 1835)
1929 – Billy Mosforth, English footballer and engraver (b. 1857)
1937 – George Gershwin, American pianist, songwriter, and composer (b. 1898)
1959 – Charlie Parker, English cricketer, coach, and umpire (b. 1882)
1966 – Delmore Schwartz, American poet and short story writer (b. 1913)
1967 – Guy Favreau, Canadian lawyer, judge, and politician, 28th Canadian Minister of Justice (b. 1917)
1971 – John W. Campbell, American journalist and author (b. 1910)
  1971   – Pedro Rodríguez, Mexican racing driver (b. 1940)
1974 – Pär Lagerkvist, Swedish novelist, playwright, and poet Nobel Prize laureate (b. 1891)
1976 – León de Greiff, Colombian poet and educator (b. 1895)
1979 – Claude Wagner, Canadian lawyer, judge, and politician (b. 1925)
1983 – Ross Macdonald, American-Canadian author (b. 1915)
1987 – Avi Ran, Israeli footballer (b. 1963)
  1987   – Yaakov Yitzchok Ruderman, American rabbi and scholar (b. 1901)
1989 – Laurence Olivier, English actor, director, and producer (b. 1907)
1991 – Mokhtar Dahari, Malaysian footballer and coach (b. 1953)
1994 – Gary Kildall, American computer scientist, founded Digital Research (b. 1942)
1998 – Panagiotis Kondylis, Greek philosopher and author (b. 1943)
1999 – Helen Forrest, American singer (b. 1917)
  1999   – Jan Sloot, Dutch computer scientist and electronics technician (b. 1945)
2000 – Pedro Mir, Dominican lawyer, author, and poet (b. 1913)
  2000   – Robert Runcie, English archbishop (b. 1921)
2001 – Herman Brood, Dutch musician and painter (b. 1946)
2003 – Zahra Kazemi, Iranian-Canadian freelance photographer (b. 1948)
2004 – Laurance Rockefeller, American financier and philanthropist (b. 1910)
  2004   – Renée Saint-Cyr, French actress and producer (b. 1904)
2005 – Gretchen Franklin, English actress and dancer (b. 1911)
  2005   – Jesús Iglesias, Argentinian racing driver (b. 1922)
  2005   – Frances Langford, American actress and singer (b. 1913)
2006 – Barnard Hughes, American actor (b. 1915)
  2006   – Bronwyn Oliver, Australian sculptor (b. 1959)
  2006   – John Spencer, English snooker player and sportscaster (b. 1935)
2007 – Glenda Adams, Australian author and academic (b. 1939)
  2007   – Lady Bird Johnson, American beautification activist; 43rd First Lady of the United States (b. 1912)
  2007   – Alfonso López Michelsen, Colombian lawyer and politician, 32nd President of Colombia (b. 1913)
  2007   – Ed Mirvish, American-Canadian businessman and philanthropist, founded Honest Ed's (b. 1914)
2008 – Michael E. DeBakey, American surgeon and educator (b. 1908)
2009 – Reg Fleming, Canadian-American ice hockey player (b. 1936)
  2009   – Arturo Gatti, Italian-Canadian boxer (b. 1972)
  2009   – Ji Xianlin, Chinese linguist and paleographer (b. 1911)
2013 – Emik Avakian, Iranian-American inventor (b. 1923)
  2013   – Egbert Brieskorn, German mathematician and academic (b. 1936)
  2013   – Eugene P. Wilkinson, American admiral (b. 1918)
2014 – Charlie Haden, American bassist and composer (b. 1937)
  2014   – Carin Mannheimer, Swedish author and screenwriter (b. 1934)
  2014   – Bill McGill, American basketball player (b. 1939)
  2014   – Tommy Ramone, Hungarian-American drummer and producer (b. 1949)
  2014   – John Seigenthaler, American journalist and academic (b. 1927)
  2014   – Randall Stout, American architect, designed the Taubman Museum of Art (b. 1958)
2015 – Giacomo Biffi, Italian cardinal (b. 1928)
  2015   – Satoru Iwata, Japanese game programmer and businessman (b. 1959)
  2015   – André Leysen, Belgian businessman (b. 1927)
  2017   – Jim Wong-Chu, Canadian poet (b.1949)
2020 – Frank Bolling, American baseball second baseman (b. 1931)
2021 – Charlie Robinson, American actor (b. 1945)
  2021   – Renée Simonot, French actress (b. 1911)

Holidays and observances
Christian Feast Day:
Benedict of Nursia
Olga of Kiev
Pope Pius I
July 11 (Eastern Orthodox liturgics)
China National Maritime Day (China)
Day of the Bandoneón (Argentina)
Day of the Flemish Community (Flemish Community of Belgium)
Eleventh Night (Northern Ireland)
Free Slurpee Day (Participating stores of the 7-Eleven chain in North America)
National Day of Remembrance of the victims of the Genocide of the Citizens of the Polish Republic committed by Ukrainian Nationalists (Poland, established by the 22 July 2016 resolution of Sejm in reference to the July 11, 1943 Volhynian Bloody Sunday)
Gospel Day (Kiribati)
Imamat Day (Isma'ilism)
National Day of Commemoration, held on the nearest Sunday to this date (Ireland)
The first day of Naadam (July 11–15) (Mongolia)
World Population Day (International)

References

External links

 
 
 

Days of the year
July